Sankt Peter-Ording Airfield  is an airport in Sankt Peter-Ording, Schleswig-Holstein, Germany.

Facilities

See also
 Transport in Germany
 List of airports in Germany

References

Airports in Schleswig-Holstein